Dato' Yap Pian Hon (born 4 November 1943) is a Malaysian politician from the Malaysian Chinese Association (MCA), a component party in the Barisan Nasional (BN). He is a veteran party leader from the state of Selangor, Malaysia.

Yap was a former Democratic Action Party (DAP) member and had left the party for MCA in 1974.

Political career
Yap was the Selangor State Legislative Assemblyman for Serdang (Selangor state constituency) for five terms; representing DAP (1969-1974) and MCA (1974-1978; 1982–1995). Then Yap served as the Member of Parliament for Serdang (federal constituency) for three terms from 1995 to 2008. In the 2013 general election Yap was energetic and optimistic for being nominated again as the BN candidate for the Serdang parliamentary seat although already in his seventies. Somehow, unluckily he lost.

Yap joined DAP in 1968 and successfully stand for 1969 general election in Serdang state seat. He won but the state assembly was suspended from 1969 to 1971 upon national emergency declared because of 13 May incident in 1969. In 1973, Yap approached Selangor ruling BN's Menteri Besar Harun Idris for help to solve the problem of 50 families were to be evicted after living for 50 years on mining land at the 8th mile Puchong Road to make way for a development project and the problem was solved in one month after the mining company allocated a piece of land for the families. Somehow Yap's actions had caused some disagreement and dispute with Lim Kit Siang, then party secretary-general. Yap quit DAP just before he got axed to be Independent. He joined MCA after wooed by MCA president Lee San Choon in 1974 and stand for MCA in 1974 general election.

Yap was a MCA former Youth chairman; a Serdang assemblyman and a Selangor executive councillor; was very outspoken regarding Chinese school and education matters.  He was once detained under the Internal Security Act 1960 (ISA) during Operasi Lalang in 1987. He was also formerly three terms being one of MCA four vice-presidents from 1990 to 1999. He failed in his following attempts to be re-elected as the party vice-president again in 1999, 2005 and 2008 party elections. Despite being elected three times as vice-president, Yap was never recommended for the position of a minister or deputy minister, unlike the other vice-presidents. He was often described as “cat with nine lives” for his political tenacity.

One of his most notable contribution for the community of Serdang is the establishment of 1Malaysia Clinic in the Serdang area. The clinic would cater to almost 200,000 individual in 30 housing areas in the particular area.

Election results

Honours
  :
 Member of the Order of the Defender of the Realm (AMN) (1977)
  :
 Companion of the Order of the Crown of Selangor (SMS)
 Knight Commander of the Order of the Crown of Selangor (DPMS) – Dato' (1985)

See also

 Serdang (Selangor state constituency)
 Serdang (federal constituency)

External links
 九命猫部落格 MPSerdang (1995-2008) Blog
 马华史里肯邦安部落格 MCA Seri Kembangan Blog

References

1943 births
Living people
People from Selangor
Malaysian politicians of Chinese descent
Former Democratic Action Party (Malaysia) politicians
Independent politicians in Malaysia
Malaysian Chinese Association politicians
Members of the Dewan Rakyat
Members of the Selangor State Legislative Assembly
Selangor state executive councillors
21st-century Malaysian politicians
Members of the Order of the Defender of the Realm
Knights Commander of the Order of the Crown of Selangor